Chemokine receptor 6 also known as CCR6 is a  CC chemokine receptor protein which in humans is encoded by the CCR6 gene.  CCR6 has also recently been designated CD196 (cluster of differentiation 196). The gene is located on the long arm of Chromosome 6 (6q27) on the Watson (plus) strand. It is 139,737 bases long and encodes a protein of 374 amino acids (molecular weight 42,494 Da).

Function 
This protein belongs to family A of G protein-coupled receptor superfamily. The gene is expressed in lymphatic and non-lymphatic tissue as spleen, lymph nodes, pancreas, colon, appendix, small intestine. CCR6 is expressed on B-cells, immature dendritic cells (DC), T-cells (Th1, Th2, Th17, Treg), natural killer T cells (NKT cells) and neutrophils. The ligand of this receptor is CCL20 or in the other name - macrophage inflammatory protein 3 alpha (MIP-3 alpha). This chemokine receptor is special because it binds only one chemokine ligand CCL20 in compare to other chemokine receptors. CCR6 has a key role in connection between immature DC an adaptive immunity. This receptor has been shown to be important for B-lineage maturation and antigen-driven B-cell differentiation, and it may regulate the migration and recruitment of dendritic cells and T cells during inflammatory and immunological responses. Alternatively spliced transcript variants that encode the same protein have been described for this gene.

Interleukin 4 (IL-4) and interferon gamma (IFNγ) suppress expression of CCR6 in langerhans cells development and interleukin 10 (IL-10) induces the expression. It can regulate immune response in inflammatory tissue.

Proinflammatory Th17 cells express CCR6 and its ligand CCL20. CCR6 influences their migration to sites of inflammation. Some Th17 cells migrate via chemokine gradient of CCL20 to inflammatory sites and themselves can express more CCL20 to bring in more Th17 cells and regulatory T-cells (Treg). This can lead to chronic inflammation.  In some models, the lack of CCR6 leads to less severe autoimmune encephalomyelitis.

Clinical significance 
CCR6 has a function in development and metastatic spread of gastrointestinal malignancies. Expression of CCR6 was found to be up-regulated in colorectal cancer. Many patients with colorectal cancer have liver metastases. Colorectal carcinoma cells express CCR6 and CCL20. High level of CCL20 in liver chemoattract colorectal carcinoma cells and cause metastases in liver. Novel research has identified a microRNA that is able to downregulate CCR6 in cancer cell lines.

CCR6 has been associated with Crohn's disease.

References

External links

Further reading 

 
 
 
 
 
 
 
 
 
 
 
 
 
 
 
 
 
 
 
 

Chemokine receptors
Clusters of differentiation